Xyrias is a genus of eels in the snake eel family Ophichthidae. It currently contains the following species:

 Xyrias chioui McCosker, W. L. Chen & Hong Ming Chen, 2009
 Xyrias guineensis (Blache, 1975)
 Xyrias multiserialis (Norman, 1939) (Speckled snake eel)
 Xyrias revulsus D. S. Jordan & Snyder, 1901 (Strict snake eel)

References

 

Ophichthidae
Taxa named by David Starr Jordan